Muhammad Hardyman bin Abdul Lamit is a Bruneian footballer who plays as a midfielder for Kota Ranger FC. He has represented Brunei in football and also in futsal.

Club career
Hardyman previously played for QAF FC ever since their entry into the B-League back in 2003. He won the Bruneian championship three times in a row with QAF, along with two League Cups and two Super Cups. When the club declined to continue playing in the Brunei Super League in 2015, he transferred to Jerudong FC along with many of his QAF teammates, finishing sixth in the table that year. 

Hardyman stayed with Jerudong FC in 2016 after the club suffered a mass exodus of players. He eventually was appointed club captain. He scored against Tabuan U21 on 9 April in a 2–2 draw to help his team gain their first point of the season.

International career
Hardyman made appearances for the Brunei under-21s in the first two Hassanal Bolkiah Trophy tournaments in 2002 and 2005.

Hardyman made his international debut for Brunei at the 2004 AFC Asian Cup qualification match against Myanmar on 23 March 2003. He was a second-half substitute in place of Fadlin Galawat as the Wasps lost the game 5–0. He then played for Brunei while the national team was represented by his then club QAF FC in 2006 and 2009. 

Hardyman was also a member of the Brunei national futsal team and represented Brunei in 2003, his first appearances were at the 2003 AFF Futsal Championship in Kuantan, Malaysia.

Honours

Team
QAF FC
 Brunei Premier League (3): 2005–06, 2007–08, 2009–10
 Brunei League Cup (2): 2008, 2009

Individual
Shell Helix B-League Young Player of the Year: 2004

References

External links

1986 births
Living people
Association football midfielders
Bruneian footballers
Brunei international footballers